"Remember When" is a song written and recorded by American country music artist Alan Jackson. Released in October 2003 as the second and final single from his compilation album, Greatest Hits Volume II, it spent two weeks at number 1 on the U.S. Billboard Hot Country Songs chart in February 2004 and peaked at number 29 on the Billboard Hot 100.

Content
In "Remember When", Jackson looks back on his life with his wife. He describes their love from their first time together, through raising their children, and describes how he and his wife will "remember when" the children were young after they are grown.

Critical reception
Billboard called the single "the most poignant, well written country song to hit the format in a long time."

"Remember When" debuted at number 45 on the U.S. Billboard Hot Country Singles & Tracks for the week of November 8, 2003, and reached number one on the chart.  The song was certified Gold by the RIAA on January 31, 2005, and has sold 1,571,000 copies in the United States as of November 2016.

Music video
The music video was directed by Trey Fanjoy, and premiered on CMT on January 12, 2004. It features Jackson singing the song while sitting on a stool playing a guitar, as home movie footage of Jackson's childhood and life plays in the background. He is also seen in some scenes dancing with his wife Denise.

Charts

Weekly charts

Year-end charts

References

2003 singles
Alan Jackson songs
Songs written by Alan Jackson
Songs about nostalgia
Songs about old age
Music videos directed by Trey Fanjoy
Song recordings produced by Keith Stegall
Arista Nashville singles
Country ballads
2003 songs